Zvi Yehuda Kook (23 April 1891 – 9 March 1982) was a prominent ultranationalist Orthodox rabbi. He was the son of Abraham Isaac Kook, the first Ashkenazi chief rabbi of British Mandatory Palestine. Both father and son are credited with developing Kookian Zionism, which became the dominant form of Religious Zionism. He was Rosh Yeshiva (dean) of the Mercaz HaRav yeshiva.

Kook's fundamentalist teachings were a significant factor in the formation and activities of the modern religious settlement movement in the Israeli-occupied West Bank and Gaza, largely through his influence on the Gush Emunim movement, which was founded by his students. Many of his ideological followers established such settlements, and he has been credited with the dissemination of his father's ideas, helping to form the basis of Religious Zionism.

Kook presided for nearly six decades over the Mercaz HaRav yeshiva founded by his father in Jerusalem, which became "the flagship yeshiva of religious Zionism", where hundreds of future militants, opposed to territorial compromises and promoting Israeli settlement of the Occupied Palestinian Territories, received their formative education.

Biography

Zvi Yehuda Kook was born on the eve of Passover in 1891 in Zaumel in the Kovno Governorate of the Russian Empire (now Žeimelis in Northern Lithuania), where his father served as rabbi and was a prominent local Zionist. His mother was his father's second wife, Reiza Rivka, the niece of Eliyahu David Rabinowitz-Teomim, Chief Rabbi of Jerusalem together with Shmuel Salant. Kook was named after his maternal grandfather, Zvi Yehuda Rabinowitz-Teomim.

In 1896, his father, with his entire family, moved to Boisk, Latvia, where he ran a yeshiva and served as a parish rabbi. There Kook studied Talmud under the guidance of Rabbi Reuven Gotfreud, the son-in-law of Yoel Moshe Salomon, one of the founders of Petah Tikva. Later, from 1999 onward, Kook was also tutored by Benjamin Menashe Levin, a guest of their family. His father, until his dying day, was to remain Kook's principal teacher, though at this time he hired a private tutor to teach his son Russian.

In 1904, at age 13, Kook moved to Jaffa, when his father was appointed Chief Rabbi of the city, then part of Ottoman-controlled Palestine. Like his father, he would celebrate each year the date of his aliyah (emigration to the Land of Israel) on the 28th day of Iyyar.

In 1906, Kook, by then 15, went to study at Torat Haim under its rosh yeshiva, Zerah Epstein. Some years later he returned to his father's home in Jaffa, where he continued his studies. It was around this time that he developed a close relationship with Yaakov Moshe Harlap, with whom he studied Kabbalah. Harlap formed part of his father's close circle. In 1908, he began to edit his father's writings, a task he continued down to his death, as he considered himself the only person capable of authoritatively interpreting them. It has been claimed he contributed to the preface on halakha (Jewish law) regarding the heter mechirah (sale permit) for the Sabbatical year attached to his father's work Shabbat Haaretz, which was published in 1910.

Feeling that he had not devoted enough time to Torah study he first went to Porat Yoseph, the leading Sephardic yeshiva of Jerusalem. Then, on Binyamin Levin's suggestion, he left for Halberstadt, Germany to teach at the local yeshiva and study philosophy. In addition to his own studies, Kook taught Talmud, halakha, and Bible to young men in the area.

With the outbreak of World War I in 1914, Kook was arrested as a citizen of the Russian Empire, an enemy of Germany. After several weeks in a detention camp in Hamburg, he was released and allowed to return to Halberstadt, where he needed to report once every two days in the local office. Only the following year, at the end of 1915, was he granted permission to leave Germany and join his father, who was stranded in St. Gallen, Switzerland, due to the war. There he continued to study under his father's guidance, until the latter left to fill a rabbinic position in London in 1916.

In 1920, he returned to Palestine (then under the British Mandate) and began teaching at Netzakh Israel school. A year later, he went to Europe to promote his father's new movement, Degel Yerushalayim a spiritual complement of secular Zionism.

In 1922, he married Chava Leah Hutner in Warsaw. Chava Leah died childless in February 1944, and Kook refused to remarry, remaining a widower until his death nearly 40 years later. From 1923, he served as the administrative director of the Mercaz HaRav yeshiva. After Harlap died in 1952, he became Rosh Yeshiva until his own death. The yeshiva assumed its present stature only much later.

Kook père had died in 1935, at a time when religious thinkers had a negligible impact on the Yishuv and his ideas had failed to attract much attention among both religious and Zionist Jews. The yeshiva's fortunes waned, and it struggled to survive down to the 1960s, when it managed to attract a spare 20 students. In the mid-sixties, its standing rapidly improved as a result of frustrations encountered among elite graduates of Bnei Akiva when their attempts to exert influence in the National Religious Party were met with a rebuff. Thereafter, this group, which constituted a secretive fraternity called Gahelet (including such rabbinical figures as Eliezer Waldman, Moshe Levinger and Haim Druckman) shifted their attentions towards Kook and his yeshiva. After the Six-Day War in 1967, of which he has been called 'the ultimate theologian,' he induced the Israeli government to approve the building of settlements in the West Bank and Gaza, and sent his students to that mission. He subscribed to his father's view that the Chief Rabbinate in Palestine was the precursor of the future Sanhedrin.

Kook wrote little in his final years. His remarks were elliptical in their allusive references to rabbinical traditions many of his followers were unfamiliar with, and his authority rested more on his charismatic figure – charisma was something his father stressed – than his writings. He died in Jerusalem on 9 March 1982, which coincided with Purim that year, and was buried in the Mount of Olives Jewish Cemetery. His passing created a leadership vacuum within Gush Emunim, which subsequently moved in the direction of collective decision making.

Ideology
Zionism began as a secular movement often led by disbelievers many of whom rejected Jewish religious traditions, one of which held that any collective 'return' of the Jewish people, as opposed to individual aliyah, depended on the direct intervention of the Messiah. The Kooks' innovation consisting in elaborating a theology that bridged the gap between a faith that saw Zionism as a heresy, and the Zionist programme for the development of a secular state for Jews. As Kook's father phrased it, a Jewish polity must "build secularly and sanctify afterwards."

The process of redemption

Zvi Kook, together with Harlap, was heir to a tradition of messianic demonizing thought going back at least to Judah Alkalai, in which the redemption of Jews in Israel was a premise for, and precursor to, the general uplifting of mankind. Whereas his father viewed Zionists as unwitting agents in the divine plan for redemption, – only a 'slim membrane' was all that separated antinomian messianism, of the type disastrously exemplified by Shabbatai Zevi, from authentic messianic redemption,-  Zvi Kook went one step further. Believing that the secular state already embodied in nuce the hidden spark of the sacred,  he argued that the messianic age of redemption had already arrived   This task was to be furthered in the present age by extending Jewish rule over the land occupied by Israel in 1967, also by means of settlements. This redemptive process across generations would, he argued, involve three stages, the first of which had already been achieved: (a) the establishment of the State of Israel, a contemporary expression of the Davidic Kingdom; (b)the restoration of complete Jewish sovereignty against Amalek; and, once these two preconditions were satisfied (c) the Third Temple would be established on the Haram al-Sharif/Temple Mount in Jerusalem.

Within Gush Emunim, now defunct, his words were often reported and taken to be akin to prophecies. In Kook's vision, Jews were unique, the yardstick for mankind, with Judaism forming the core of humanity and reality itself, and Israel analogized to the soul while the world at large was likened to the body.In this context, Zvi Kook extended the ideas of his father  and his fellow student of kabbalah Harlap, who had an outlook of hostility to Gentiles and asserted that the failure of the peoples of the world to surrender to Israel would cause their downfall. Kook took this Jewish nationalism as in fact cosmopolitan, in the sense that the redemption of the world was contingent on Israel, an idea that proved influential with the early Hapoel HaMizrachi thinkers.

Kook saw in the establishment of the modern State of Israel a major step in the redemption of the Jewish people (Atḥalta de-geulah). Many Torah scholars envision redemption as a future era that arrives complete from the very start, and not an ongoing process.  Kook claimed that the process was  evidenced in the development of Israeli agriculture where every tomato and banana was invested with 'sanctity'. He based this idea on():But you, O mountains of Israel, will produce branches and bear fruit for My people Israel, for they will soon come home, and Rashi’s gloss on the way it had been interpreted as an indication of the End by Rabbi Abba at Sanhedrin 9. Rashi wrote: "When the Land of Israel gives its fruit nicely, then the End is near, and there is no more [to the] revealed End [than this]."

According to his disciple, rabbi Eliyahu Avichail, who founded the immigrant organization Amishav in 1975, Kook himself advised him to search for dispersed communities of Jews who had lost contact with their roots, prepare them for conversion (giyur) and facilitate their 'return' to Israel. He believed he had discovered such lost Jews, putative remnants of the Ten Lost Tribes, in India and Nepal among Tibetan-Burmese peoples such as the Mizo and Hmar. Though initially considered a 'crackpot', Avichail succeeded, after conferring on these peoples the ethnonym Bnei Menashe, in having some two thousand relocated in Israel, especially in the Israeli settlement near the Palestinian city of Hebron, namely Kiryat Arba, through financial assistance from his philanthropical sponsor Irving Moskowitz.

Hostility to Christianity
Though his own father was long tempted by the antinomian strain of Jewish messianism, World War 1 had led him to conclude that the great source of contemporary evil lay in the antinomian dispensation of Christianity. Zvi Kook's ideology, reflecting his father's 'intense loathing' or theological disdain, is characterized by a staunch hostility to Christianity, which he regarded as a 'crime against Israel', the 'refuse of Israel', an image recalling Talmudic traditions of Jesus, 'the criminal of Israel' (poshea Israel), being boiled in excrement. Christianity was a form of idolatry, a blasphemy against the divinity of Jews. He refused to back away from the antisemitic notion that Jews bore responsibility for Jesus's crucifixion. This apparently was one of his ways of repudiating the victim mentality ascribed to Jews in diaspora.

He began to outline his opinions in this regard in 1952, after concluding that Israel's establishment constituted a war against Western Christendom. Rummaging through two millennia of sources uncritically, such as Toledot Yeshu, he revived a tradition of anti-Christian polemics which, according to some critics, had not seen the likes for over a millennium. Key points in this attitude affirm that Christianity is a Jewish heresy; that whereas the Christian god is dead, the Jewish god is alive. He asserted that the term min/minim apostates in rabbinical literature indeed denoted Christians.

When the Vatican hoisted the Israeli flag on the occasion of Golda Meir's visit to Pope Paul VI in 1973, Kook sneered at the pope as an old galakh (shaven, i.e. tonsured Christian priest) unashamedly raising a symbol that signified the destruction of Christendom. He wanted to rid Israel of Christian and ultimately Western influences, something that extended down to opposing the use of the Gregorian civil calendar. He avoided reading his father's works in the light of Western philosophy because that would be a form of "spiritual miscegenation". This influenced his views of Judaism, the authentic version being that practiced and taught in modern Israel as opposed to the Judaism of the exilic diaspora, which was, he thought, irremediably inflected by the deleterious effects of living among Christians.

His writings on this theme circulate among Israeli settlers, or Torah purists aspiring to a life of secluded study and, conversely, among anti-semites.

The theology of war
Sometimes among his acolytes called the "prophet of Greater Israel,", Kook's father had taught that settlement of the land should come about by peaceful means, not by war.  In 1938 the rabbi of Tel Aviv, Moshe Avigdor Amiel (1883-1946), argued that even if the redemption were to be enabled by killing Arabs, that option would have to be repudiated since it would mean redemption through bloodshed.

Nonetheless, his mystical meditations on war, published in 1921 and edited by Zvi Kook with the title Orot me-Ofel (Lights from the Gloom), which would assume great significance after 1967 among his son's settler acolytes, could be read as providing Kook's rabbinical endorsement for using war to appropriate land, as in the following passages:

'When there is a great  war in the world, the power of Messiah is aroused.The time of song (zamir) has arrived, the scything (zamir) of tyrants, the  wicked perish from the world, and the world is invigorated and the voice  of the turtledove is heard in our land.'
The ability demanded of the Jewish people is the ability to appropriate the  powers of the nations, Esau's aggressive powers, and to use them on the path to the "celestial Jerusalem."

At the same time, dissenters could challenge this use of Kook's authority by citing another passage from the same tract:-

'Until such happy times as it will be feasible to conduct an independent national policy without recourse to vicious and barbaric practices.. it is not in the interest of Jacob to wield sovereignty, when this entails wholesale bloodshed and ingenuiity of a sinister kind.'
Zvi Kook, with his irredentist perspective, ratcheted up a notch his father's theology of war. Every one of the wars engaged in, prior to the establishment of the state down to the Yom Kippur war, were, in his interpretation, stages on the path of Israel's redemption. While ruling out out aggressive war, Zvi Kook did preach that recourse to military force was justified if Arabs refused to acknowledge Jewish rights to the land and if they also opted to wage war. According to his former student, David Samson
 He compared [our situation] to a man who was forcefully expelled from his home, which others seized and trespassed upon. That is exactly what happened to us. Rav Kook stressed that the Arabs had, and have, absolutely no national right to the land. If they deny the justice of our cause, and choose to go to war against us, we must persuade them – he said – with our tanks.'

Political views

The teachings of Zvi Kook are considered to be the source for the ongoing tension among Israeli settlers between the idea that the state of Israel is sacred, and doubts whether its secular authority could be exercised independently,

Initially, Zvi Kook had expressed unreserved support for Zionism, and was fiercely opposed to orthodox critics of that ideology, seeing Zionism as a vehicle embodying God's will for the redemption of the Jews. Even before the Six Days War Kook expressed concern for Jewish Biblical sites in the adjacent West Bank under Jordanian rule. On the eve of the outbreak of hostilities he shocked his students by speaking of the 'truncated' state of the Land of Israel, inducing in them a sense that they had sinned in forgetting about places like Hebron, Shechem and Jericho. He hailed Israel's 1967 victory as proof of the emergence of God's leadership over both Israel and the entire world. The Yom Kippur War proved to be a watershed moment for his thinking. In its aftermath, his views underwent a sea-change. He vigorously opposed proposals to yield territory such as those being advanced by Henry Kissinger, whom he dismissed as 'the goy woman's husband',  arguing that God's desire for the territorial integrity of the Land of Israel, in his view a single sacred entity, overruled any human desire for negotiated compromises. The laws of the Torah took precedence over secular law.

At a 1974 lecture delivered at Merkaz Haraz in the presence of Moshe Dayan, he stated that moves to yield the Golan, and the West Bank would lead to a war, one that would be fought 'over our bodies and limbs'. The Gush Emunim movement predominantly formed by religious Zionists soon came under the dominating influence of graduates from Mercaz HaRav driven by a messianic activism to thwart territorial compromises. Surrendering territory was, he taught, as strictly forbidden as eating pork, since foreign sovereignty over any part of the Land of Israel would be treif.

Eventually Zvi Kook came round to considering the Israeli government itself as illegitimate, as a tyrannical dictatorship. It was an offense to God to seek Gentile support. Referendums thermselves were illegitimate because they could never overturn the prescriptions of the Torah  He opposed Menachem Begin's peace negotiations with Egypt – in his view the Sinai formed part of Biblical Israel -and also Begin's proposal to allow West Bank Palestinians administrative autonomy. These ideas, if acted on, would constitute in Kook's view treason and would cover Israel with 'eternal shame'  Though Kook disapproved of religious coercion in Israel, he argued that the rabbinical concept of peace, shalom reflected a state of absolute justice, which required at times the force of coercion, and did not entail, as in the modern assumption, an implicit renunciation in principle of recourse to violence. Peace will only obtain when the Biblical Land of Israel is revived, with the Temple, and the subservience of the nations of the world to the Chosen People.

He staunchly opposed any political moves to relinquish parts of the Land of Israel.
"We are not a nation of conquerors. We are returning to the land of our fathers. No one, no prime minister, has the authority to renounce any part of the country. It belongs to the entire people of Israel, to the Jews of Pakistan, the United States and the Soviet Union."

Relationship with Meir Kahane
According to the widow of Rabbi Meir Kahane, Kook greatly admired Kahane. When Kahane formed a political party, Kook endorsed his bid for a Knesset seat. Though he had originally been a staunch supporter of the National Religious Party, he broke with them in 1974 after they entered the Rabin government over his opposition. In his letter of support to Kahane, he stated: 'The presence of Rabbi Meir Kahane and his uncompromising words from the Knesset platform will undoubtedly add strength and value to the obligatory struggle on behalf of the entire Land of Israel.' The announcement of his support of Kahane and his letter were made available to the Jewish Telegraphic Agency.

According to his student Rabbi Uzi Kalheim, however, Kook's support of Kahane was more nuanced. The rabbi approved of Kahane's activities in the U.S. to protect Jews and bolster Jewish pride. But in Israel, Kook did not agree with Kahane's positions but felt that Kahane should have the right to a place in the Knesset and express his views there, even though Kook did not assent to them. He is quoted as explicitly writing that his support for Kahane was "without any identification with or connection to the specifics of his words and aims".

Views on Palestinians/Arabs
Kook's view was that Israel's struggle with the Arabs over the Land of Israel is a national one. While denying that Jews had ever expelled Palestinians in the Palestinian exodus in 1948-49 – in his view they had all simply ran away of their own accord, through cowardice or exaggerated fear – Zvi Kook thought those remaining could stay provided they accepted that the land was Jewish, and acquiesced in their status as a minority. Prior to 1967, he considered the conflict between Arabs and Israelis as ethnic not religious. They were in his view unlike Christians, whom he considered idolatrous, a purely monotheistic people and therefore, in their case, the conflict with Jews would be a passing matter. The rights of individual minorities were to be respected. When the Israeli High Court ruled that the Elon Moreh group of settlers had to evacuate lands under Palestinian ownership and belonging to the village of Rujeib, the rabbi told his followers to abide by the court's verdict, even though his ideological view was that "there is no such thing as Arab land in Eretz Israel." Benny Katzover recalled: "The rabbi told us several times, 'We cannot damage land belonging to Ahmad and Mustafa', that we couldn't touch lands that had belonged to Arabs for generations."

On several occasions he sent letters to newspapers expressing his displeasure over reports that Arabs were being maltreated.

Students
Zvi Kook's influence as a religious authority on the fundamentalist rabbis who drove the settler movement has been thought of as to some degree analogous to the impact of religious figures like Sayyid Qutb and Ayatollah Khomeini on younger generations of intellectuals who were to figure prominently in the radicalization of Islam.

The most well known among his students are rabbis Shlomo Aviner, Zvi Thau, Yisrael Ariel Zalman Melamed, Yitzchak Sheilat, Dov Lior, Zephaniah Drori, Yoel Bin-Nun, Eliezer Melamed, David Samson, Haim Drukman, Moshe Levinger, and Yaakov Ariel. Several of these students are among those whom he encouraged to establish settlements and moshavim.

Writings
Most of the younger Kook's published works were editions and collections of his father's work, but many of his original articles and letters were later collected and published in book form.

 Collections of articles: Or Lenetivati, Lenetivot Israel, two volumes.
 Collections of letters: Tzemach Tzvi, Dodi Litzvi. Some of his letters are printed in Igrot HaRa'aya.
 Lectures: Sichot HaRav Tzvi Yehuda on the Torah (5 volumes), Mesilat Yesharim, Moadim (festivals), etc., by Rabbi Shlomo Aviner.

See also
 Jewish fundamentalism

Notes

Citations

Sources

External links

 HaAretz: The 10 who Made Israel What It Is – Haaretz
 The Culture of Israel – Full text

1891 births
1982 deaths
Abraham Isaac Kook
Burials at the Jewish cemetery on the Mount of Olives
Chardal
Emigrants from the Russian Empire to the Ottoman Empire
Israeli Orthodox rabbis
Zvi Yehuda
Lithuanian Jews
Philosophers of Judaism
Religious Zionist rosh yeshivas